Jonathan Tornato (born June 1, 1989) is a French professional basketball player for Olympique Antibes of LNB Pro A.

Tornato played with AS Monaco until he was cut in 2015. He posted 8.5 points and 5.2 rebounds per game in his last year. On October 1, 2016, he signed with the Antibes Sharks. He averaged 11.7 points and 6.8 rebounds per game with the Sharks.

References 

1989 births
Living people
ADA Blois Basket 41 players
AS Monaco Basket players
French men's basketball players
HTV Basket players
JDA Dijon Basket players
Nanterre 92 players
Olympique Antibes basketball players
People from La Seyne-sur-Mer
Sportspeople from Var (department)
Centers (basketball)